Several ships of the Spanish Navy have borne the name Argonauta, in honour of the mythological navigators argonauts:
  (1798), an 80-gun ship, captured in 1805 during the Battle of Trafalgar and later sank as result of damage sustained during a gale. 
Argonauta (1806), a schooner, captured in 1806.
 , a 74-gun ship, wrecked in 1810 on west coast of Sardinia.

Spanish Navy ship names